This is a list of notable music artists who primarily play intelligent dance music (IDM). Artists/groups are listed alphabetically (excluding "The") and proper names are alphabetized by their first name.

#
808 State
μ-ziq

A–K

Actress
Acustic
Air Liquide
Alarm Will Sound
Alva Noto
Alpha 606
Amon Tobin
Andy Stott
Aphex Twin
Apparat
Arca
Arovane
Autechre
B12
Beaumont Hannant
Ben Frost
Benn Jordan
Biosphere
Björk
The Black Dog
Blanck Mass
Boards of Canada
Bochum Welt
Bogdan Raczynski
Boom Bip
Brothomstates
Burial
Bvdub
C418
Cabaret Voltaire
Carbon Based Lifeforms
Capitol K
Casino Versus Japan
Clan Balache
Ceephax Acid Crew
Cex
Chris Clark
Chris Douglas
Christ.
Clocolan
Cylob
Daedelus
Daisuke Tanabe
Daniel Myer
Deadbeat
Deepchord
Demdike Stare
Deru
Diagram of Suburban Chaos
DMX Krew
Dopplereffekt
Drexciya
Eight Frozen Modules
Emptyset
Esem
FaltyDL
Fennesz
The Field
The Fireman
The Flashbulb
Floating Points
Flying Lotus
Forest Swords
Four Tet
Freescha
Funkstörung
The Future Sound Of London
Gas
Gescom
Global Communication
Global Goon
Goldie
Gridlock
Himuro Yoshiteru
I am Robot and Proud
Innovaders
Isan
J Lesser
Jackson and his Computer Band
Jan Jelinek
Jega
Jello
Jlin
John Tejada
Jon Hopkins
Kevin Blechdom
Kid606
Kim Hiorthøy
Kodomo
Koreless

L–Z

Lackluster
Legowelt
Lemon Jelly
LFO
Locust Toybox
Lone
Loscil
Lorn
Lusine
Machinedrum
Mark Pritchard
Marumari
Matmos
Meat Beat Manifesto
Mick Harris
Mira Calix
Monolake 
Moderat
Mouse on Mars
Murcof
Nathan Fake
Obfusc
Ochre
Oneohtrix Point Never
The Orb
Orbital
Oval
Pan Sonic
Pedro INF
Peshay
Phoenecia
Photek
Pilote
Plaid
Prefuse 73
Plastikman
Plone
Pole
Push Button Objects
Pye Corner Audio
Raoul Sinier
Richard Devine
Richard H. Kirk
Romulo Del Castillo
Rival Consoles
The Sabres of Paradise
Secede
Secret Mommy
Seefeel
Seekae
Shigeto
Skylab
Solvent
Speedy J
Squarepusher
Stendeck
Steve Hauschildt
Syndrone
System 7
Sun Electric
Susumu Yokota
Sweet Exorcist
Team Doyobi
Telefon Tel Aviv
Thom Yorke
Tim Hecker
Trentemøller
TRS-80
Two Lone Swordsmen
Tycho
Ulrich Schnauss
Universal Indicator
Vector Lovers
Venetian Snares
Vulva
Wagon Christ
William Orbit
Wisp
Yppah
Zoon van snooK

References

Lists of musicians by genre